Papaya Bull is a Brazilian cartoon series, which is being shown by Nickelodeon Brazil. The series is a co-production of Boutique Filmes, Nickelodeon and NBCUniversal International Networks. Produced by Birdo Studio and 52 Animation Studio.

Papaya Bull has 13 episodes and 26 segments, the show debuted on 2 October 2017 in Brazil on Nickelodeon Brazil, and premiered in Latin America on 5 May 2018 on the Latin American Nickelodeon channel.

Inspired by the folklore of the state of Santa Catarina, with characters with names of beaches of the state capital, Florianopolis, the animation Papaya Bull debuted on October 2, 2017, in its native country, through Nickelodeon Brazil. The idea of using the papaya steer as the basis for the story was by Ricardo Peres and Rodrigo Eller, 52 Animation Studio.

Synopsis 
The story takes place on the island of Papaya, where each child receives an ox as soon as it is born, the ox that will be his best friend and protector for life. Everyone has their least Cacupé, who arrived mysteriously on the island and ended up staying with Socrates, a neurotic ox that was left over. Now the pair will challenge the customs of Papaya Island.

Characters 
 Cacupé 
 Hermano
 Joaquina
 Guri
 Sócrates
 Floriano
 Dani

Episodes

External links 

2010s animated television series
Brazilian children's animated television series
Brazilian flash animated television series
Portuguese-language Nickelodeon original programming